Guido Borelli da Caluso is an Italian painter. He was born in Caluso in 1952. He comes from an artistic background, and his family always encouraged him to develop his talent, as early as childhood. He won a contest at 13 and held his first exhibition at the age of 17 at Ars Plauda Gallery in Turin. After high school, he received his artistic training at the Accademia Albertina in Turin. Today, he has permanent exhibitions in art galleries, in Italy, France, the United Kingdom and in the U.S.

Permanent Exhibitions 
 Gallery 1000, Carmel, CA - 
 Marlin Art - Deer Park, NY- United States
 Galerie d'Art -Art Passion-, Saint Paul de Vence - France
 Paul Robinson Gallery -Marietta-GA- United States
 French Art Network, New Orleans - United States
 StewArt Gallery, Battle - UK
 www.fineartamerica.com
 Galleria Esposti-Milano-Italy

External links
 Personal website
 Vineyard Collection limited editions

1952 births
Living people
20th-century Italian painters
20th-century Italian male artists
Italian male painters
21st-century Italian painters
21st-century Italian male artists
Accademia Albertina alumni
People from the Province of Turin